Jeff A. Richardson (date of birth unknown) is a former Bermudian cricketer. Richardson was a right-handed batsman.

Richardson made his debut for Bermuda in the 1994 ICC Trophy, making two appearances in the tournament against Hong Kong and Kenya. He later made his debut List A cricket for Bermuda against Barbados in the 1996/97 Shell/Sandals Trophy, with him making three further List A appearances in that tournament. He scored a total of 39 runs in his four List A matches, at an average of 13.00 and a high score of 29.

References

External links
Jeff Richardson at ESPNcricinfo
Jeff Richardson at CricketArchive

Living people
Bermudian cricketers
Year of birth missing (living people)